These are the Australian number-one albums of 2007, per the ARIA Charts.

See also
2007 in music
List of number-one singles in Australia in 2007

References

Number-one albums
2007
Australia Albums